Leptastacidae is a family of copepods belonging to the order Harpacticoida.

Genera

Genera:
 Afroleptastacus Huys, 1992
 Aquilastacus Huys & Conroy-Dalton, 2005
  Archileptastacus Huys, 1992

References

Copepods